Devanahalli Assembly constituency is one of the 224 constituencies in the Karnataka Legislative Assembly of Karnataka a south state of India. It is also part of Chikballapur Lok Sabha constituency.

Members of Legislative Assembly

Mysore State (Bangalore North constituency)
 1951 (Seat-1): K. V. Byre Gowda, Indian National Congress
 1951 (Seat-2): R. Munisamaiah, Indian National Congress

Mysore State (Hosakote Devanahalli constituency) 
 1957 (Seat-1): S. R. Ramaiah (Congress)
 1957 (Seat-2): Rukmaniamma (Congress)

Mysore State (Devanahalli constituency)
 1962: R. Muniswamiah, Indian National Congress
 1967: D. S. Gowdh, Indian National Congress
 1972: M. R. Jayaram, Indian National Congress

Karnataka State
 1978: B. N. Bache Gowda, Janata Party
 1978 (By-Poll): K. Narayanappa, Janata Party
 1983: A. M. Mariyappa, Janata Party
 1985: P. C. Munishamaiah, Janata Party
 1989: Muninarasimhaiah, Indian National Congress
 1994: G. Chandranna, Janata Dal
 1999: Muninarasimhaiah, Indian National Congress
 2004: G. Chandranna, Janata Dal (Secular)
 2008: Venkataswamy, Indian National Congress
 2013: Pilla Munishamappa, Janata Dal (Secular)

See also
 Bangalore Rural district
 List of constituencies of Karnataka Legislative Assembly

References

Assembly constituencies of Karnataka
Bangalore Rural district